Clemente Anselmo Agustino Cattini (born 20 August 1937) is an English rock and roll drummer of the late 1950s and 60s, who was a member of The Tornados before becoming well known for his work as a session musician. He is one of the most prolific drummers in UK recording history, appearing on hundreds of recordings by artists as diverse as Cliff Richard and Lou Reed, and has featured on 42 different UK number one singles.

Biography 
Born to Italian parents living in Stoke Newington, North London, Cattini worked in his father's restaurant before deciding to pursue a career in music. He began as a drummer at The 2i's Coffee Bar, backing performers such as Terry Dene, before joining the touring band known as the Beat Boys, backing singers managed by Larry Parnes, including Marty Wilde and Billy Fury. He then joined Johnny Kidd & the Pirates, playing on their hit "Shakin' All Over", and became Joe Meek's in-house drummer, backing artists such as John Leyton and Don Charles, before helping found The Tornados in 1961, and playing on their international No. 1 hit "Telstar".

In 1965 he became a session musician, drumming on tracks by The Kinks, Herman's Hermits, Dusty Springfield, The Merseys, Bee Gees, Lulu, Marianne Faithfull, Tom Jones, P. J. Proby, The Hollies, Paul and Barry Ryan, Gene Pitney, Donovan, Love Affair, Jeff Beck, Engelbert Humperdinck, Nirvana, the Ivy League, Edison Lighthouse, The Yardbirds, The Family Dogg, Marc Bolan, Clodagh Rodgers, Keith West, The Flower Pot Men, Georgie Fame, Roy Harper, Ralph McTell, Harmony Grass, Joe Cocker, Graham Gouldman and Brian Auger. In the 1970s, he played on recordings by Marvin, Welch & Farrar, Lou Reed, Cliff Richard, Justin Hayward, Phil Everly, Julie Covington, Claire Hamill, Alvin Stardust, Bay City Rollers, Kenny, the Wombles, Brotherhood of Man, Carl Douglas, Christie, Tim Rose, Demis Roussos, The Goodies, Stephanie de Sykes, John Betjeman, Malcolm and Alwyn, John Schroeder, Paul McCartney, Hank Marvin, Mike Batt, Chris Spedding, Bob Downes, Dave Kelly, Sweet Dreams, Christopher Neil, Evelyn Thomas, Barbara Pennington, Slapp Happy, Mike Berry and Grace Kennedy, and prog rock bands including Beggars Opera, Amazing Blondel and Edwards Hand.

Cattini has played on at least 42 UK number 1 singles, including "Telstar", Ken Dodd's "Tears", Rolf Harris's "Two Little Boys", Clive Dunn's "Grandad", "Ernie (The Fastest Milkman in the West)" by Benny Hill, "Whispering Grass" by Windsor Davies and Don Estelle, Peters and Lee's "Welcome Home", Typically Tropical's "Barbados", J. J. Barrie's "No Charge", Renée and Renato's "Save Your Love", and "(Is This The Way To) Amarillo" by Tony Christie featuring Peter Kay. He also played in the orchestra for BBC TV's Top of the Pops, and toured with Cliff Richard, Roy Orbison, Lynda Carter, The Kids from "Fame" and many others. He was also considered for Led Zeppelin – he was initially on Jimmy Page's shortlist of drummers when forming the band before they settled on John Bonham. He had earlier played alongside John Paul Jones on Donovan's hit single "Hurdy Gurdy Man".

In the 1980s, he reactivated the Tornados' name for tours and, in 1989, played in the West End run of The Rocky Horror Show. He more recently recorded the drums for the track "No Tears to Cry" from Paul Weller's 2010 album Wake Up the Nation. He was portrayed by James Corden in the 2009 film Telstar, and appeared himself playing John Leyton's chauffeur.

In 2016, he recorded a new version of the 1960s hit "Telstar", with the North London ska band the Skammers.

Clem Cattini's memoirs, My Life, Through the Eye of a Tornado, was published in July 2019.

References

External links 
Coda-uk.co.uk Biography

Tornados and Clem Cattini information centre run by Tom Hammond
2008 Radio Interview of WFMU
2016 Newspaper article

1937 births
English drummers
British male drummers
Living people
English session musicians
People from Stoke Newington
English people of Italian descent
The Jeff Beck Group members
Screaming Lord Sutch and the Savages members
Brian Auger and the Trinity members
The Ivy League (band) members
Johnny Kidd & the Pirates members
The Tornados members